Alejandro Nicolás de los Santos (17 May 1902 — 16 February 1982) was an Argentinian footballer who played as a forward for San Lorenzo, Dock Sud, El Porvenir, Huracán and Argentina.

Early life
De los Santos was born in Paraná on 17 May 1902 to Angolan Argentine parents.

Career
In 1921, de los Santos signed for San Lorenzo. On 22 May 1921, de los Santos made his debut for the club in a 2–0 win against Banfield. After spells at Dock Sud and El Porvenir, de los Santos signed for Huracán in 1931, scoring 21 goals in 73 league appearances, making a total of 25 goals in 88 appearances in all competitions.

In December 1925, de los Santos won the South American Championship with Argentina. De los Santos was the first black footballer to appear for Argentina.

References

1902 births
1982 deaths
People from Paraná, Entre Ríos
Afro-Argentine sportspeople
Argentine people of Angolan descent
Argentine footballers
Association football forwards
Argentine football managers
Copa América-winning players
Argentine Primera División players
Argentina international footballers
San Lorenzo de Almagro footballers
Sportivo Dock Sud players
El Porvenir footballers
Club Atlético Huracán footballers
Club Atlético Huracán managers
Sportspeople from Entre Ríos Province